The Organization for Security and Co-operation in Europe (OSCE) is the world's largest regional security-oriented intergovernmental organization with observer status at the United Nations. Its mandate includes issues such as arms control, promotion of human rights, freedom of the press, and free and fair elections. It employs around 3,460 people, mostly in its field operations but also in its secretariat in Vienna, Austria, and its institutions.

Originating from 1975, most of its 57 participating countries are in Europe, but there are a few members present in Asia and North America. The participating states cover much of the land area of the Northern Hemisphere. It was created during the Cold War era as a forum for discussion between the Western Bloc and Eastern Bloc. The OSCE is concerned with early warning, conflict prevention, crisis management, and post-conflict rehabilitation.

History

Roots

The Organization has its roots in the 1975 Conference on Security and Co-operation in Europe (CSCE). Talks had been mooted about a European security grouping since the 1950s but the Cold War prevented any substantial progress until the talks at Dipoli in Espoo began in November 1972. These talks were held at the suggestion of the Soviet Union which wished to use the talks to maintain its control over the communist states in Eastern Europe, and President of Finland Urho Kekkonen hosted them in order to bolster his policy of neutrality. Western Europe, however, saw these talks as a way to reduce the tension in the region, furthering economic cooperation and obtaining humanitarian improvements for the populations of the communist bloc.

The recommendations of the talks, in the form of "The Blue Book", gave the practical foundations for a three-stage conference called the "Helsinki process". The CSCE opened in Helsinki on 3 July 1973 with 35 states sending representatives. Stage I only took five days to agree to follow the Blue Book. Stage II was the main working phase and was conducted in Geneva from 18 September 1973 until 21 July 1975.

The result of Stage II was the Helsinki Final Act. This was signed by the 35 participating states during Stage III, which took place in Finlandia Hall between 30 July – 1 August 1975. It was opened by the Holy See's diplomat Cardinal Agostino Casaroli, who was the chairman of the conference.

The concepts of improving relations and implementing the act were developed over a series of follow-up meetings, with major gatherings in Belgrade (4 October 19778 March 1978), Madrid (11 November 19809 September 1983) and Vienna (4 November 198619 January 1989).

The Copenhagen commitment was written "to ensure that individuals are permitted to exercise their rights to peaceful assembly and freedom of association, including the right to form, join and participate effectively in non-governmental organizations, which seek the promotion and protection of human rights and fundamental freedoms."

The Moscow Mechanism was agreed in 1991.

CSCE becomes OSCE
The fall of the Soviet Union required a change of role for the CSCE. The Charter of Paris for a New Europe, signed on 21 November 1990, marked the beginning of this change. The process was capped by the renaming of the CSCE as the OSCE on 1 January 1995, in accordance with the results of a conference held in Budapest in 1994. The OSCE now had a formal secretariat, a Senior Council, a Parliamentary Assembly, a Conflict Prevention Centre, and an Office for Free Elections, which later became the Office for Democratic Institutions and Human Rights.

In December 1996, the "Lisbon Declaration on a Common and Comprehensive Security Model for Europe for the Twenty-First Century" affirmed the universal and indivisible nature of security on the European continent.

The OSCE Kosovo Verification Mission was established by the Permanent Council in October 1998 and shuttered in June 1999 amidst the recalcitrance of the Milosevic regime.

In Istanbul on 19 November 1999, the OSCE ended a two-day summit by calling for a political settlement in Chechnya and adopting a Charter for European Security.

The OSCE's refusal to police events surrounding the 2008 Kosovo declaration of independence still rankles in Russia.

Through its Office for Democratic Institutions and Human Rights (ODIHR), the OSCE observes and assesses elections in its member states, in order to support fair and transparent democratic processes, in keeping with the mutual standards to which the organization is committed; between 1994 and 2004 the OSCE sent teams of observers to monitor more than 150 elections, typically focusing on elections in emerging democracies. In 2004, at the invitation of the United States Government, the ODIHR deployed an assessment mission, made up of participants from six OSCE member states, which observed that year's US presidential election and produced a report. It was the first time that a US presidential election was the subject of OSCE monitoring, although the organization had previously monitored state-level American elections in Florida and California, in 2002 and 2003.

Following an unprecedented period of activity in the 1990s and in the first decade of the 21st century, the OSCE faced accusations from the CIS states (primarily Russia) of being a tool for the Western states to advance their own interests. For instance, the events in Ukraine in 2004 (the "Orange Revolution") led to allegations by Russia of OSCE involvement on behalf of the pro-Western Viktor Yushchenko (President of Ukraine from 2005 to 2010). At the 2007 Munich Conference on Security Policy, Vladimir Putin stated:They [unnamed Western States] are trying to transform the OSCE into a vulgar instrument designed to promote the foreign policy interests of one or a group of countries. And this task is also being accomplished by the OSCE's bureaucratic apparatus, which is absolutely not connected with the state founders in any way. Decision-making procedures and the involvement of so-called non-governmental organizations are tailored for this task. These organizations are formally independent but they are purposefully financed and therefore under control.

Following the 2008 U.S. presidential election, Russian parliamentarian Leonid Slutsky accused the OSCE's ODIHR  of having double standards. The point was made that while numerous violations of the voting process were registered, its criticism came only from within the United States (media, human rights organizations, McCain's election staff), while the OSCE - known for its criticism of elections on the post-Soviet space - remained silent.

The OSCE Mission to Georgia was established in November 1992 with its headquarters in the capital Tbilisi. The Mission's mandate expired on 31 December 2008. Between these dates it was powerless to control the outbreak of the August 2008 Russo-Georgian war.

2012 Texas controversy 
Before the U.S. presidential elections of November 2012, the OSCE announced its intention to send electoral observers to Texas and to other U.S. states. This prompted the Attorney General of Texas Greg Abbott to send letters to U.S. Secretary of State Hillary Clinton and to the OSCE, threatening to arrest OSCE officials if they should enter electoral premises in Texas and break Texas law. In reply, the U.S. Department of State stated that OSCE observers enjoyed immunities. In the event, no incidents between OSCE and Texas authorities were recorded during the elections.

2017 Turkey constitutional referendum 
In April 2017, Turkish President Recep Tayyip Erdoğan criticized the OSCE for reporting that opposition "No" campaigners in the Turkish constitutional referendum had faced bans, police interventions and arrests. Erdoğan said: "Now the Organization for Security and Cooperation in Europe says if the result is 'yes', that means there are a lot of problems. Who are you? First of all, you should know your place. This is not your duty."

2022 unrest in Kazakhstan 
Russian Foreign Ministry Spokeswoman Maria Zakharova criticised the OSCE for being indifferent to the 2022 Kazakh unrest. At the same time, she also noted how closely the OSCE follows events in some other countries. She said the OSCE was not helping journalists who have been attacked in Kazakhstan when she mentioned the attack on the office of the Kazakh branch of the Mir TV and radio company in Almaty, which involved some 500 perpetrators. Sergey Lavrov in an interview condemned the null OSCE reactions to the events in Kazakhstan as terrible and shameful.

OSCE involvement in Ukraine (2014-present) 

On 21 March 2014, the OSCE deployed its Special Monitoring Mission to Ukraine at the request of Ukraine's government. The mission has received mixed reviews. While some observers have applauded its function as the "eyes and ears of the international community", others have accused the mission of bias towards either Russia or Ukraine.

On 27 April 2014, the Girkin group that had taken control in the city of Sloviansk took eight members of the OSCE Special Monitoring Mission (OSCE SMM) as hostages. The group appointed Vyacheslav Ponomarev as mayor of the city.

During the war in Donbas, an OSCE observer allowed Russian separatists to travel in a vehicle with the organization's markings; this prompted allegations that the OSCE was biased in the war and not interested in carrying out its duties of mediating a ceasefire. The organization issued a statement regretting the incident.

Moreover, the OSCE Observer Mission at Russian Checkpoints Gukovo and Donetsk (which is organizationally separate from the Special Monitoring Mission) also received criticism alleging that only two checkpoints on the Russian–Ukrainian border are currently being monitored, which Daniel Baer, the US ambassador to the OSCE at the time, described as "seriously inadequate".

On the other hand, Ukraine has faced criticism following a BBC report showing an alleged violation of the Minsk Agreement when Ukraine stationed tanks in a residential neighbourhood of Avdeevka. The mission has also been criticized for taking months to deploy drones to help monitor borders as well as withdrawing them after only several weeks of use due to Russian electronic attacks. Drones have been reintroduced to observe the conflict in 2018.

In 2014, an advisor to the Ukrainian Ministry of Defence wrongly claimed that approximately 80% of the OSCE observers located near Mariupol were Russian citizens and that many had ties to Russian security agencies such as the FSB and the GRU. In reality, one observer out of 17 in Mariupol was a Russian citizen. In total, the mission reports the number of Russian citizens in its ranks as 39 out of 720, or 5,4%. The organization has also been accused of allegedly revealing the locations of Ukrainian troops to Russian forces during the conflict.

On 1 December 2014, the mission was in the area to "facilitate a local ceasefire and monitor the repair works on a power station", that it "heard an exchange of artillery fire between unspecified parties", and that "artillery rounds were impacting at approximately 1km to the east of the SMM's position; therefore the SMM left due to security concerns". Furthermore, the report states that the "SMM team in the JCCC was in constant contact with the SMM team in Staromikhailivka". No mention of a wounded observer is made.

On 27 October 2015, a suspended OSCE monitor confirmed he had been a former employee of Russia's Main Intelligence Directorate. The suspended SMM stated that he had no trouble receiving the position and neither the OSCE nor Ukraine's Security Service thoroughly checked his background. Following the report the OSCE issued a comment stating the monitor had been fired due to violations of the organization's code of conduct.

On 6 April 2016, photos of OSCE monitors attending the wedding of a Russian separatist emerged. The wedding had taken place in June 2015. The OSCE expressed regret over the incident, issuing a statement saying "The unprofessional behaviour displayed by the monitors in the picture is an individual incident that should not be abused to cast a shadow on the reputation of other mission members." The OSCE reported that the monitors were no longer with the OSCE special monitoring mission.

In April 2017, an OSCE vehicle struck a mine, which killed one SMM member and injured two. Two armoured vehicles were on patrol near Luhansk when one struck the mine. The dead man was an American paramedic, while the injured included a woman from Germany and a man from the Czech Republic.

On 18 July 2018, the German broadcaster ARD reported that Russian intelligence services had received inside information about the activities of the OSCE Special Monitoring Mission to Ukraine from a staff member of the OSCE. The insider information consisted of observers' preferences in alcohol and women, their financial situation, and their contacts in Ukraine. The OSCE issued a statement expressing concern over the alleged security breach.

Russia has accused members of the Mission of working for the Ukrainian SBU and of spying on the pro-Russian separatists. Furthermore, Russia has accused the mission of bias after it reported troop movements from separatist forces, accusing the mission of ignoring similar moves from Ukraine. Russia's foreign minister also has claimed that the mission failed to pay sufficient attention to human and minority rights within the Government-controlled areas of Ukraine. Furthermore, he criticised that the mission did not clearly attribute ceasefire violations to either side.

The 2022 Russian invasion of Ukraine began on February 24. The OSCE mandate in Ukraine expired on March 31, 2022, due to objections by Russia. On April 24, 2022, the OSCE protested the detention of four staff members in Donetsk and Luhansk, without specifying who had detained them. On 20 September, two Ukrainian OSCE staffers were sentenced to 13 years of prison by a court in the Luhansk People's Republic for "alleged high treason and espionage for the United States."

In March 2022, 45 participating States promoted, with the support of Ukraine, the activation of the Moscow Mechanism for the establishment of an independent expert mission on violations and abuses committed in the war of the Russian Federation, supported by Belarus, against Ukraine. The report of the Mission of Experts was presented to the OSCE Permanent Council on 13 April 2022 and documented clear patterns of violations of international humanitarian law by the Russian Armed Forces in Ukraine.

On 2 June 2022, the same 45 participating States invoked again the Moscow Mechanism to establish a new mission of experts to consider, follow up and build upon the findings of the Moscow Mechanism report published in April 2022. The subsequent report, presented on 14 July 2022 to the OSCE Permanent Council, confirmed the outcomes of the previous mission and identified blatant violations of international humanitarian law, mainly attributable to the Russian armed forces, as well as widespread violations of human rights, especially in the territories under effective control of the Russian Federation.

The Russian delegation was not invited to the 29th OSCE Ministerial Council in December 2022 where the delegates considered the ramifications and regional security challenges created by Russia’s continued war against Ukraine. There were calls to assess the reparations that Russia should be accountable for.

Since the start of its invasion of Ukraine, Russia has seized €2.7 million worth of armored vehicles that were previously part of the OSCE Special Monitoring Mission to Ukraine. According to a letter that was sent by Russian OSCE representatives to OSCE Secretary-General Helga Schmid in January 2023, 71 trucks and cars were brought to the Lugansk People's Republic and the Donetsk People's Republic as "evidence" and criminal proceedings were initiated against former OSCE personnel for espionage.

OSCE Parliamentary Assembly 

In 2004, the OSCE Parliamentary Assembly sent election observers to the U.S. presidential elections. The OSCE Parliamentary Assembly's president at the time was Democratic Congressman Alcee Hastings. Hastings had previously been impeached for corruption by the U.S. Congress. The OSCE faced criticism of partisanship and double standards due to Hastings's past and the fact that the OSCE's mandate was to promote democracy and the values of civil society.

In 2010, the Parliamentary Assembly of the Organization for Security and Co-operation in Europe was criticized from within by the Latvian delegation for lacking transparency and democracy. Spencer Oliver (b. 1938) secretary general of the OSCE Parliamentary Assembly, who held the post from the organization's inception in 1992 until 2015, faced a challenge from the Latvian Artis Pabriks. According to the rules of the OSCE Parliamentary Assembly, the incumbent general secretary can only be replaced with a full consensus minus one. Pabriks called the rules "quite shocking from the perspective of an organization that's monitoring elections".

Synopsis

Languages 
The six official languages of the OSCE are English, French, German, Italian, Spanish and Russian.

Participating states

Bilateral Priorities with Participating States

Partners for co-operation 

 Middle East and North Africa States
 
 
 
 
 
 

 Asia
 1992 
 1994 
 2000 
 2003 
 Oceania
 2009

Legal status 

A unique aspect of the OSCE is the non-binding status of its constitutive charter. Rather than being a formal treaty ratified by national legislatures, the Helsinki Final Act represents a political commitment by the heads of government of all signatories to build security and cooperation in Europe on the basis of its provisions. This allows the OSCE to remain a flexible process for the evolution of improved cooperation, which avoids disputes and/or sanctions over implementation.

By agreeing to these commitments, signatories for the first time accepted that treatment of citizens within their borders was also a matter of legitimate international concern.  This open process of the OSCE is often given credit for helping build democracy in the Soviet Union and Eastern Europe, thus leading to the end of the Cold War. Unlike most international intergovernmental organizations, however, the OSCE does not have international legal personality on account of the lack of legal effect of its charter. As a result, its headquarters' host, Austria, had to confer legal personality on the organization in order to be able to sign a legal agreement regarding its presence in Vienna.

Structure and institutions 
Political direction to the organization is given by heads of state or government during summits. Summits are not regular or scheduled but held as needed. The last summit took place in Astana (Kazakhstan), on 1 and 2 December 2010. The high-level decision-making body of the organization is the OSCE Ministerial Council, which meets at the end of every year. At the ambassadorial level, the OSCE Permanent Council convenes weekly in Vienna and serves as the regular negotiating and decision-making body. The chairperson of the Permanent Council is the ambassador to the Organization of the participating State which holds the chairmanship.

In addition to the Ministerial Council and Permanent Council, the Forum for Security Co-operation is also an OSCE decision-making body. It deals predominantly with matters of military co-operation, such as modalities for inspections according to the Vienna Document of 1999.

The OSCE's Secretariat is located in Vienna, Austria. The organization also has offices in Copenhagen, Geneva, The Hague, Prague and Warsaw.

, the OSCE employed 3,568 staff, including 609 in its secretariat and institutions and 2,959 in its 17 field operations.

The Parliamentary Assembly of the Organization for Security and Co-operation in Europe is made up of 323 parliamentarians from 57 member states. The Parliamentary Assembly performs its functions mainly via the Standing Committee, the Bureau, and 3 General Committees (Committee on Political Affairs and Security, Committee on Economic Affairs, Science, Technology and Environment, and Committee on Democracy, Human Rights and Humanitarian Questions).

The Parliamentary Assembly passes resolutions on matters such as political and security affairs, economic and environmental issues, and democracy and human rights. Representing the collective voice of OSCE parliamentarians, these resolutions and recommendations are meant to ensure that all participating states live up to their OSCE commitments. The Parliamentary Assembly also engages in parliamentary diplomacy, and has an extensive election observation program.

The oldest OSCE institution is the Office for Democratic Institutions and Human Rights (ODIHR), established in 1991 following a decision made at the 1990 Summit of Paris. It is based in Warsaw, Poland, and is active throughout the OSCE area in the fields of election observation, democratic development, human rights, tolerance and non-discrimination, rule of law, and Roma and Sinti issues. The ODIHR has observed over 300 elections and referendums since 1995, sending more than 50,000 observers. It has operated outside its own area twice, sending a team that offered technical support to the 9 October 2004 presidential elections in Afghanistan, an OSCE Partner for Co-operation, and an election support team to assist with parliamentary and provincial council elections on 18 September 2005. ODIHR is headed by Matteo Mecacci, Italy.

The Office of the OSCE Representative on Freedom of the Media, established in December 1997, acts as a watchdog to provide early warning on violations of freedom of expression in OSCE participating States. The representative also assists participating States by advocating and promoting full compliance with OSCE norms, principles and commitments regarding freedom of expression and free media. As of 2020, the current representative is Teresa Ribeiro, Portugal.

The High Commissioner on National Minorities was created on 8 July 1992 by the Helsinki Summit Meeting of the Conference on Security and Cooperation in Europe. It is charged with identifying and seeking early resolution of ethnic tension that might endanger peace, stability or friendly relations between participating states. As of 2020, the current representative is Kairat Abdrakhmanov (Kazakhstan).

Each year the OSCE holds an OSCE Asian Conference with partner nations (currently Australia, Thailand, South Korea, Japan and Afghanistan).

The OSCE and the Government of the Kyrgyz Republic established the OSCE Academy in 2002. The aim of the OSCE Academy is "to promote regional cooperation, conflict prevention and good governance in Central Asia through offering post-graduate education, professional training and intellectual exchange."

List 
 Court of Conciliation and Arbitration
 High Commissioner on National Minorities
 Minsk Group
 Office for Democratic Institutions and Human Rights
 Parliamentary Assembly
 Representative on Freedom of the Media
 Secretariat

Field operations 
Almost all field operations of OSCE have been conducted in countries of former Yugoslavia and the former Soviet Union.

Active 
The following field missions are currently active:

Discontinued 
The following field missions have been completed, closed or discontinued:

Chairmanship 

The OSCE chairmanship is assumed at yearly intervals by one participating state, which then plays the central role in managing the organization's work and in its external representation. The foreign minister of the country possessing the chair holds the OSCE's most senior position as Chairperson-in-Office (CiO).

The responsibilities of the Chairperson-in-Office include:
 co-ordination of the work of OSCE institutions;
 representing the OSCE;
 supervising activities related to conflict prevention, crisis management, and post-conflict rehabilitation.

The CiO is assisted by the previous and incoming chairpersons-in-office; the three of them together constitute the OSCE Troika. The CiO nominates Personal Representatives – experts in fields of priority for the CiO. The origin of the institution lies with the Charter of Paris for a New Europe (1990), and the Helsinki Document (1992) formally institutionalized this function.

The OSCE Chair for 2022 was Poland, with Zbigniew Rau serving as Chairperson-in-Office. The Chair for 2023 is North Macedonia represented by Bujar Osmani as Chairperson-in-Office.

Chairmanship history 
Chairmanship of the OSCE is held by a member state on a calendar-year basis, with the minister for foreign affairs of that state performing the function of Chairperson-in-Office. The table below shows the holders since 1991.

Secretary General 
While the Chairperson-in-Office is the OSCE's most senior official, on a day-to-day basis the Secretary General is the OSCE's chief administrative officer and can, when requested by the Chairmanship, serve as a representative of the Chairperson-in-Office. Since the establishment of the office in 1992, Secretary Generals have been:

Summits of heads of state and government

Ministerial Council Meetings (ordinary)

Fiscal history 
Since 1993, the OSCE's budget by year (in millions of euro) has been:

Relations with the United Nations 
The OSCE considers itself a regional organization in the sense of Chapter VIII of the United Nations Charter and is an observer in the United Nations General Assembly. The Chairperson-in-Office gives routine briefings to the United Nations Security Council.

The three dimensions

Politico-military dimension (first dimension) 
The OSCE takes a comprehensive approach to the politico-military dimension of security, which includes a number of commitments by participating States and mechanisms for conflict prevention and resolution. The organization also seeks to enhance military security by promoting greater openness, transparency and co-operation.

 Arms control
The end of the Cold War resulted in a huge amount of surplus weapons becoming available in what is known as the international grey market for weapons. The OSCE helps to stop the—often illegal—spread of such weapons and offers assistance with their destruction.  The OSCE hosts the annual exchange of information under the Conventional Forces in Europe treaty.  The OSCE has also implemented two additional exchanges of information, the Vienna Document and the Global Exchange of Military Information.  The Open Skies Consultative Commission, the implementing body for the Treaty on Open Skies, meets monthly at its Vienna headquarters.

 Border management
The actions taken by the OSCE in border monitoring range from conflict prevention to post-conflict management, capacity building and institutional support.

 Combating terrorism
With its expertise in conflict prevention, crisis management and early warning, the OSCE contributes to worldwide efforts in combating terrorism.

 Conflict prevention
The OSCE works to prevent conflicts from arising and to facilitate lasting comprehensive political settlements for existing conflicts. It also helps with the process of rehabilitation in post-conflict areas.

 Military reform
The OSCE's Forum for Security Co-operation provides a framework for political dialogue on military reform, while practical activities are conducted by field operations, as well as the Conflict Prevention Centre.

 Policing
OSCE police operations are an integral part of the organization's efforts in conflict prevention and post-conflict rehabilitation.

 Implementation
The OSCE was a rather small organization until selection by the international community to provide electoral organization to post war Bosnia and Herzegovina in early 1996. Ambassador Frowick was the first OSCE representative to initiate national election in September 1996, human rights issues and rule of law specifically designed to provide a foundation for judicial organization within Bosnia and Herzegovina.

The OSCE had regional offices and field offices, to include the office in Brcko in northeastern Bosnia and Herzegovina which remained in limbo until the Brcko Arbitration Agreement could be decided, finalized and implemented.

Brcko become a "special district" and remains so today.

The OSCE essentially took the place of the United Nations in Bosnia and Herzegovina in part because the Bosnian leadership felt deep contempt for the UN efforts to stop the war which began in 1991 and ended in 1995. During the time the United Nations were attempting a political solution, thousands of UN troops were posted in and around Bosnia and Herzegovina with special emphasis on Sarajevo. From 1991 to 1995, over 200,000 Bosnians were killed and over one million displaced and another million as refugees.

The OSCE continues to have a presence and a number of initiatives to bring a sustained peace to the region.

Economic and environmental dimension (second dimension) 

Activities in the economic and environmental dimension include the monitoring of developments related to economic and environmental security in OSCE participating States, with the aim of alerting them to any threat of conflict; assisting States in the creation of economic and environmental policies, legislation and institutions to promote security in the OSCE region.

 Economic activities
Among the economic activities of the OSCE feature activities related to migration management, transport and energy security. Most activities are implemented in co-operation with partner organizations.

 Environmental activities
The OSCE has developed a range of activities in the environmental sphere aimed at addressing ecologic threats to security in its participating States. Among the activities feature projects in the area of hazardous waste, water management and access to information under the Aarhus Convention.

Human dimension (third dimension) 
The commitments made by OSCE participating States in the human dimension aim to ensure full respect for human rights and fundamental freedoms; to abide by the rule of law; to promote the principles of democracy by building, strengthening and protecting democratic institutions; and to promote tolerance throughout the OSCE region.

 Combating trafficking in human beings
Since 2003, the OSCE has had an established mechanism for combating trafficking in human beings, as defined by Article 3 of the Palermo Protocol, which is aimed at raising public awareness of the problem and building the political will within participating states to tackle it effectively.

The OSCE actions against trafficking in human beings are coordinated by the Office of the Special Representative and Co-ordinator for Combating Trafficking in Human Beings. Maria Grazia Giammarinaro, a judge in the Criminal Court of Rome, took Office as the Special Representative in March 2010. From 2006 to 2009, this Office was held by Eva Biaudet, a former Finnish Minister of Health and Social Services. Biaudet currently serves as Finnish Ombudsman for Minorities. Her predecessor was former Austrian Minister Helga Konrad, who served as the first OSCE Special Representative for Combating Trafficking in Human Beings.

The activities around Combating Trafficking in Human Beings in the OSCE Region of the Office of the Special Representative include:
 Co-operation with governments, helping them to accept and act on their responsibilities for curbing trafficking in human beings;
 Providing governments with decision and policy-making aids and offering guidance on anti-trafficking management, with the aim of arriving at solutions tailored to the needs of the individual countries and in line with international standards;
 Assisting governments to develop the national anti-trafficking structures required for efficient internal and transnational co-operation;
 Raising awareness to draw attention to the complexity of the problem and to the need for comprehensive solutions;
 Considering all dimensions of human trafficking, namely trafficking for sexual exploitation, trafficking for forced and bonded labour, including domestic servitude, trafficking into forced marriages,trafficking in organs and trafficking in children;
 Ensuring the effective interaction of all agents and stake holders involved in the fight against human trafficking, ranging from governmental authorities, law enforcement officials to NGOs, and—last but not least—international organizations, as the agencies providing support thorough expertise and know-how;
 Guaranteeing the highest possible visibility of the OSCE's fight against human trafficking to focus attention on the issue.

 Democratization
The OSCE claims to promote democracy and assist the participating states in building democratic institutions.

 Education
Education programmes are an integral part of the organization's efforts in conflict prevention and post-conflict rehabilitation.

 Elections
As part of its democratization activities, the OSCE carries out election assistance projects in the run-up to, during, and following elections. However, the effectiveness of such assistance is arguable—Kazakhstan, for example, despite being the former chair of the OSCE, is considered by many to be one of the least democratic countries in the world. Moreover, the recent democratic advances made in other Central Asian republics, notably Kyrgyzstan, have led to rumours of Soviet-style disruption of the Kyrgyz democratic process by, in particular, Kazakhstan and Russia. This may be in large part due to fears over the long-term stability of these countries' own quasi-dictatorships.

 Gender equality
The equality of men and women is an integral part of sustainable democracy. The OSCE aims to provide equal opportunities for men and women and to integrate gender equality in policies and practices.

 Human rights
The OSCE's human rights activities focus on such priorities as freedom of movement and religion, preventing torture and trafficking in persons.

 National and international NGOs
OSCE could grant consultive status to NGOs and INGOs in the form of "Researcher-in-residence programme" (run by the Prague Office of the OSCE Secretariat): accredited representatives of national and international NGOs are granted access to all records and to numerous topical compilations related to OSCE field activities.

 Media freedom
The OSCE observes relevant media developments in its participating states with a view to addressing and providing early warning on violations of freedom of expression.

 Minority rights
Ethnic conflict is one of the main sources of large-scale violence in Europe today. The OSCE's approach is to identify and to seek early resolution of ethnic tensions, and to set standards for the rights of persons belonging to minority groups and High Commissioner on National Minorities has been established.

OSCE Democracy Defender Award 
The Democracy Defender Award honors a person or group for contributions to the promotion of democracy and the defense of human rights "in the spirit of Helsinki Final Act and other OSCE principles and commitments." The award was established in 2016 on the initiative of Ambassadors of 8 countries, and supported by the delegations of the 18 countries of the OSCE (22 countries in 2017).

See also

Notes

References

External links

 
 OSCE The U.S. Mission to the OSCE
 OSCE The OSCE Mission to Bosnia and Herzegovina
 OSCE POLIS Policing OnLine Information System
 
 United States Institute of Peace online training course for OSCE required for U.S. citizens hired by the Organization. Provides a detailed outline of the OSCE, with additional modules on each major area that it is involved in. Website freely available, but tests only given to those who have submitted applications.
 Official OSCE account on Twitter
 Summer Academy on OSCE 
 
 Postage stamps of Moldova celebrating her admission to the OSCE

 
Post-Soviet alliances
Organisations based in Vienna
United Nations General Assembly observers
1973 establishments in Europe
Organizations established in 1973
Peace organizations
Intergovernmental organizations